Dublin Harbour, a division of Dublin, was a borough parliamentary constituency in Ireland. It returned one Member of Parliament (MP) to the House of Commons of the United Kingdom from 1885 until 1922. From 1918 to 1921, it was also used a constituency for Dáil Éireann.

Boundaries
This constituency comprised part of the city of Dublin. It included Dublin Port and red light district of Dublin and was one of the poorest constituencies in Ireland.

From 1885 to 1918, it was defined as:

From 1918 to 1922, it was defined as:

History
Prior to the 1885 general election, the city was the undivided two-member Dublin City constituency. Under the Redistribution of Seats Act 1885, Dublin was divided into four divisions: College Green, Dublin Harbour, St Stephen's Green and St Patrick's. Dublin Harbour was a very heavily Nationalist area. The Irish Parliamentary Party only lost political control of the constituency in 1918.

Under the Redistribution of Seats (Ireland) Act 1918, the city was allocated seven seats: in addition to the four existing constituencies, the new divisions were Clontarf, St James's and St Michan's.

Sinn Féin used the 1918 general election to elect members of Dáil Éireann, inviting all those elected in Ireland to sit as a Teachta Dála (known in English as a Deputy) in the Dáil, although only the Sinn Féin members attended. Philip Shanahan, who had participated in the Easter Rising defeated the incumbent MP, Alfie Byrne, a formidable politician who would play a prominent role in Dublin and Irish politics for almost half a century. Shanahan sat as a member of the First Dáil.

Under the Government of Ireland Act 1920, the area was combined with the College Green Division to form Dublin Mid, a 4-seat constituency for the Southern Ireland House of Commons and a single constituency at Westminster. At the 1921 election for the Southern Ireland House of Commons, the four seats were won uncontested by Sinn Féin, who treated it as part of the election to the Second Dáil. Philip Shanahan was one of the four TDs for Dublin Mid.

Under s. 1(4) of the Irish Free State (Agreement) Act 1922, no writ was to be issued "for a constituency in Ireland other than a constituency in Northern Ireland". Therefore, no vote was held in Dublin Mid at the 1922 United Kingdom general election on 15 November 1922, shortly before the Irish Free State left the United Kingdom on 6 December 1922.

Members of Parliament

Elections

Elections in the 1880s

Elections in the 1890s

Elections in the 1900s

Elections in the 1910s

See also
 Historic Dáil constituencies

Notes, citations and sources

Citations

Sources

External links
 Dáil Éireann Members Database Office of the Houses of the Oireachtas
 Dublin Historic Maps: Parliamentary & Dail Constituencies 1780–1969 (a work in progress)

Westminster constituencies in County Dublin (historic)
Dáil constituencies in County Dublin (historic)
Constituencies of the Parliament of the United Kingdom established in 1885
Constituencies of the Parliament of the United Kingdom disestablished in 1922